Marcus Ravenswaaij (6 August 1862 – 14 March 1919) was a Dutch sport shooter who competed in the 1900 Summer Olympics. He was born in Kralingen and died in Rotterdam.

In the 1900 Summer Olympics he participated in the following events:

 Team military rifle, three positions - fifth place
 military rifle, kneeling - fifth place
 individual military rifle, three positions - ninth place
 military rifle, prone - 14th place
 military rifle, standing - 14th place

References

External links
 
list of Dutch sport shooters

1862 births
1919 deaths
Dutch male sport shooters
ISSF rifle shooters
Olympic shooters of the Netherlands
Shooters at the 1900 Summer Olympics
Sportspeople from South Holland
20th-century Dutch people